Agelena dubiosa is a species of spider in the family Agelenidae, which contains at least 1,315 species of funnel-web spiders . It was first described by Embrik Strand, 1908. It is primarily found in Ethiopia.

References

dubiosa
Arthropods of Ethiopia
Spiders of Africa
Spiders described in 1908